John Coghill (John Bruce Coghill, Jr., born 1950) is an American politician, a member of the Alaska Legislature since 1999.

John Coghill may also refer to:

 John G. S. Coghill (1834–1899) British physician and medical author
 Jack Coghill (John Bruce Coghill, Sr., 1925–2019), American businessman and politician, Lieutenant Governor of Alaska 1990–1994, father of the aforementioned John Coghill
 Jon Coghill (born 1971), Australian drummer, most notably with the band Powderfinger
 John Coghill (Australian politician) (1785–1853), Scottish-born sea captain and homesteader in Australia, builder of Bedervale
 Several baronets of the Coghill baronetcies in the Baronetage of Great Britain:
 Sir John Cramer-Coghill (1732–1790), 1st Baronet of the Coghill Baronets of Coghill
 Sir John Thomas Coghill (1766–1817), 2nd Baronet of the Coghill Baronets of Coghill
 Sir John Joscelyn Coghill (1826–1905), 4th Baronet of the Coghill Baronets of Coghill
 Sir John Coghill (died 1785), 1st Baronet of the Coghill Baronets of Richings

See also
Coghill (surname)